Visa requirements for Antiguan and Barbudan citizens are administrative entry restrictions imposed by the authorities of foreign states on citizens of Antigua and Barbuda.  Antiguan and Barbudan citizens had visa-free or visa on arrival access (including eTAs) to 151 countries and territories, ranking the Antiguan and Barbudan passport 30th in the world in terms of travel freedom (tied with the Trinidadian and Tobagonian passport) according to the Henley Passport Index.

Visa requirements map

Visa requirements

Notes

Dependent, Disputed, or Restricted territories
Unrecognized or partially recognized countries

Dependent and autonomous territories

Additional Rules

Visa exemption for Schengen States

Citizens of Antigua and Barbuda are classified as 'Annex II' foreign nationals, and so are permitted to stay visa-free in the 26 member states of the Schengen Area as a whole — rather than each country individually — for a period not exceeding 3 months every 6 months.

Visa exemption in CARICOM States
Citizens of Antigua and Barbuda wishing to live and work in another CARICOM State should obtain a CSME Skills Certificate. This must be presented at Immigration in the receiving country along with a valid passport and a police certificate of character. Holders of certificates are given a maximum of six (6) months stay in the host country until their status and documents could be verified. Additional documents are required if travelling with spouse and/or dependants such as Marriage certificate, Birth Certificate, etc.

Visa exemption in OECS States
Citizens of Antigua and Barbuda can live and work in Dominica, Grenada, Saint Lucia, Saint Kitts and Nevis and Saint Vincent and the Grenadines as a result of right of freedom of movement granted in Article 12 of the Protocol of the Eastern Caribbean Economic Union of the Revised Treaty of Basseterre.

Visa exemption and requirements for the United Kingdom
Citizens of Antigua and Barbuda are able to visit the United Kingdom for up to 6 months (or 3 months if they enter from the Republic of Ireland) without the need to apply for a visa as long as they fulfil all of the following criteria:
 they do not work during their stay in the UK
 they must not register a marriage or register a civil partnership during their stay in the UK
 they can present evidence of sufficient money to fund their stay in the UK (if requested by the border inspection officer)
 they intend to leave the UK at the end of their visit and can meet the cost of the return/onward journey
 they have completed a landing card and submitted it at passport control unless in direct transit to a destination outside the Common Travel Area
 if under the age of 18, they can demonstrate evidence of suitable care arrangements and parental (or guardian's) consent for their stay in the UK

However, even though, strictly speaking, he/she is not required to apply for a visa if he/she satisfies all of the above criteria, a Citizen of Antigua and Barbuda who falls into any of the following categories has been strongly advised by the UK Border Agency (replaced by UK Visas and Immigration) to apply for a visa prior to travelling to the UK:
 he/she has any unspent criminal convictions in any country
 he/she has previously been refused or breached the terms of any entry to the UK, or been deported or otherwise removed from the UK
 he/she has previously applied for a visa and been refused one
 he/she has been warned by a British official that he/she should obtain a visa before travelling to the UK

Citizens of Antigua and Barbuda with a grandparent born either in the United Kingdom, Channel Islands or Isle of Man at any time or in the Republic of Ireland on or before 31 March 1922 can apply for UK Ancestry Entry Clearance, which enables them to work in the UK for 5 years, after which they can apply to settle indefinitely.

Consular protection of Antiguan and Barbudan Citizens abroad

Citizens of Antigua and Barbuda who require consular assistance in a foreign country where there is no Antiguan and Barbudan foreign mission may be able to request assistance from a British Embassy, high commission or consulate. For example, Antiguan and Barbudans who need to travel urgently and whose passport has expired, been lost or stolen can be issued with an emergency travel document by a British foreign mission as long as this has cleared with the Ministry of Foreign Affairs of Antigua and Barbuda.
See List of diplomatic missions of Antigua and Barbuda.

Non-visa restrictions

See also
Visa policy of Antigua and Barbuda
Antigua and Barbuda passport

References and Notes
References

Antigua and Barbuda
Foreign relations of Antigua and Barbuda